Manorá (or Manó Râ) is a barrio (neighbourhood) of Asunción, the capital of Paraguay. It has a population of 1,898 people.

Geography 
Manorá is bordered near Santo Domingo, Las Lomas, San Jorge, Ycua Sati, San Cristobal, and Villa Morra.

There are many stores around the area, including a TGI Fridays, and a McDonalds.

Toponymy 
The name is believed to have been coined by Roa Bastos in 1993. The name is Guarani for "a place of death". It could also possibly interpreted as "a place of dying", or "a place of the dead".

Notable people 

Emilio Gill - Brother of and member of the cabinet of Juan Bautista Gill (assassinated in 1877 in Manorá).
Carlos Antonio López - president of Paraguay (born November 4, 1792 in Manorá).
Francisco Solano López - president of Paraguay (born 1827 in Manorá).

References 

Neighbourhoods of Asunción